{{DISPLAYTITLE:C27H30N2O2}}
The molecular formula C27H30N2O2 may refer to:

 Asimadoline, experimental drug which acts as a peripherally selective κ-opioid receptor (KOR) agonist
 Palovarotene, a highly selective retinoic acid receptor gamma (RAR-γ) agonist